Huhla is a village in the municipality of Ivaylovgrad, in Haskovo Province, in southern Bulgaria.

Huhla Col on Trinity Peninsula in Antarctica is named after the village.

References

Villages in Haskovo Province